Laine Theatre Arts, sometimes referred to as Laines, is an independent performing arts college, based in the town of Epsom in Surrey, England.  The college was founded in 1974 by former professional dancer and dance teacher Betty Laine OBE, and developed from an earlier school, the Frecker-Laine School of Dancing. It provides specialist vocational training in dance and musical theatre.

The college prepares students for a professional career in the performing arts. The college is accredited by the Council for Dance Education and Training and it offers Qualifications and Curriculum Authority recognised qualifications validated by the Trinity College London. Key areas of study include singing, acting and dancing. It was rated "Outstanding" by Ofsted in 2016.

Overview
Laine Theatre Arts provides specialist vocational training at further and higher education level in dance and musical theatre. The college prepares students for a professional career in the performing arts and has a history of feeding artists into West End theatre, dance companies, television, film, pop music and other high-profile areas of the entertainments industry all over the world.

Training
The college offers four tracks of study, covering vocational, professional training in the performing arts:

Level 6 Diploma in Professional Dance validated by Trinity College London
Level 6 Diploma in Professional Musical Theatre validated by Trinity College London
Laine Theatre Arts Foundation Diploma (1 Year) in Dance and Musical Theatre
BA (Hons) Musical Theatre (Unique one year post level 5 Diploma, Top Up Honours Degree. Validated by the University for Creative Arts.

Both Diploma courses are accredited by Trinity College London and are recognised by the Qualifications and Curriculum Authority.  The college is also accredited to the Council for Dance Education and Training.  Many student places at the college are funded by the British Government through the Dance and Drama Awards (DaDA) scheme.

The college is also an approved centre of the Imperial Society of Teachers of Dancing.  Students have the opportunity to gain nationally recognised dance teaching qualifications with the organisation, in ballet, tap and modern theatre dance.

The college stages an annual production at the local 'Epsom Playhouse' theatre.

The college also offers evening adult dance classes, for both beginners and the already initiated.

Patrons
Sir Matthew Bourne
Derek Deane
David Grindrod
Gillian Lynne DBE
Stephen Mear
Arlene Phillips CBE
Stephen Brooker

Notable alumni
Victoria Beckham
Charlie Bruce
Karen Bruce
Warwick Davis
Louise Dearman
Kerry Ellis
Jo Gibb
Sean Ghazi
Sarah Hadland
Ruthie Henshall
Lee Latchford-Evans
Enda Markey
Gerard McCarthy
Anu Palevaara
Dominique Provost-Chalkley
Aaron Renfree
Ben Richards
Leanne Rowe
Alex Sawyer
Charlie Stemp
Summer Strallen
Nick Winston

References

External links
Official site

Schools of the performing arts in the United Kingdom
Drama schools in the United Kingdom
Dance schools in the United Kingdom
Epsom